The Gaziantep Subregion (Turkish: Gaziantep Alt Bölgesi) (TRC1) is a statistical subregion in Turkey.

Provinces 

 Gaziantep Province (TRC11)
 Adıyaman Province (TRC12)
 Kilis Province (TRC13)

See also 

 NUTS of Turkey

External links 
 TURKSTAT

Sources 
 ESPON Database

Statistical subregions of Turkey